Maragheh is a city in East Azerbaijan Province, Iran.

Maragheh may also refer to:
Maragheh, Markazi
Maragheh, North Khorasan
Maragheh, Razavi Khorasan
Maragheh County, in East Azerbaijan Province
Maragheh Khanate